Nakanune was a monthly Narodnik-oriented newspaper, published in London from January 1899 to February 1902. It published a total of 37 issues. Its director was Esper Aleksandrovich Serebryakov.

References 

Monthly newspapers
Newspapers published in London
Newspapers established in 1899
Publications disestablished in 1902
Defunct newspapers published in the United Kingdom
Russian-language newspapers